The women's 4 × 160 metres relay event at the 1966 European Indoor Games was held on 27 March in Dortmund. Each athlete ran one lap of the 160 metres track.

Results

References

4 × 400 metres relay at the European Athletics Indoor Championships
Relay